Dorcadion cervae is a species of beetle in the family Cerambycidae. It was described by Janos Frivaldszky in 1892. It is known from Hungary and Slovakia, although it is considered to be extinct in the latter region.

References

cervae
Beetles described in 1892